Percy W.H. Kettlewell (1869 - 1950) was an English priest and educationist in the early 20th century.

Kettlewell matriculated in 1888  and graduated from Keble College, Oxford University in 1890. He was ordained as a priest in 1896. In 1909 he was appointed as the  headmaster of St. Andrew's College, Grahamstown. He held this office for 24 years.

Following his retirement from the College, he became vicar of Buckland, Buckinghamshire, in England (1934–44). In 1945 he was appointed canon emeritus of the Grahamstown Cathedral.

He was active as an archaeological collector at Kasouga and at Sugar-Loaf Hill, Grahamstown. He organised a transfer of archaeological material from the Albany Museum to the British Museum in 1922.

On 29 June 1914 he married Nina Mary Denison-Clarke at Grahamstown.

Works
Kettlewell's published works include:

Notes and references

1869 births
1950 deaths
20th-century English Anglican priests
Alumni of Keble College, Oxford